Bidau Creole Portuguese was a Portuguese-based creole language that was spoken in , Nain Feto, an eastern suburb of Dili, East Timor.

Bidau Creole Portuguese is believed to have grown out of the Portuguese spoken by settlers and mestiços from Flores Island, influenced by languages introduced to the area by military men from Lifau. It shares a number of features with nearby creoles such as Macanese.

References

External links
The Languages of East Timor

Portuguese-based pidgins and creoles
Languages of East Timor
Languages extinct in the 1960s
Dili Municipality
Portuguese language in Asia